Aleksandr Yevgenyevich Kovalyov (13 May 1980, in Moscow – 13 July 2005, in Bryansk Oblast) was a Russian football player.

Kovalyov played in the Russian Premier League with FC Torpedo-ZIL Moscow.

Kovalyov was returning to Moscow after watching a Russian Cup match between FC Dynamo Bryansk and FC Dynamo Moscow with Bryansk player Aleksei Musatov in July 2005. Both footballers were killed in a traffic accident caused by a moose running onto the road.

References

1980 births
Footballers from Moscow
2005 deaths
Road incident deaths in Russia
Russian footballers
FC Moscow players
Russian Premier League players
FC Lada-Tolyatti players
Association football defenders